Thomas Michael Hoenig (born September 6, 1946) is a Distinguished Senior Fellow at the Mercatus Center. He became a director of the Federal Deposit Insurance Corporation on April 16, 2012, and served as vice chairman from November 30, 2012 to April 30, 2018.  From 1991 to 2011, he served as the eighth chief executive of the Tenth District Federal Reserve Bank, in Kansas City, United States.  In 2010, he was serving as a voting member of the Federal Open Market Committee, as one of five of the twelve Federal Reserve Bank presidents that sit on the Committee on a yearly rotating basis. He is known as an "anti-inflation hawk".

Life and career
Hoenig was born in Fort Madison, Iowa, where his father owned a plumbing business. He was raised Catholic and attended Catholic schools. Hoenig earned a B.A. in economics and mathematics from St. Benedict's College (now Benedictine College), Atchison, Kansas, and M.A. and Ph.D. degrees in economics from Iowa State University.

Hoenig joined the Federal Reserve Bank of Kansas City in 1973 as an economist in the banking supervision area. He was named a vice president in 1981 and senior vice president in 1986.

According to Fed salary figures released for 2010, Hoenig earned $374,400 per year, in the mid-range for the twelve regional bank chairs and considerably more than Fed chair Ben Bernanke ($199,700), whose pay is limited by law.

He has served as an instructor of economics at the University of Missouri-Kansas City and lectured on the U.S. banking and regulatory system for the People's Bank of China. Dr. Hoenig is a member of the Board of Trustees of the Ewing Marion Kauffman Foundation and serves on the boards of directors of Midwest Research Institute and Union Station.

On March 25, 2011, Hoenig announced his intent to retire on October 1, 2011, as required under the Federal Reserve Board's mandatory retirement rules for Federal Reserve Bank Presidents. The retirement marks 20 years as president for Hoenig whose first day as Bank president was October 1, 1991, and 38 years of total service to the Federal Reserve. On April 16, 2012, Hoenig was sworn in as vice chairman and member of the board of directors of the Federal Deposit Insurance Corporation. On April 27, 2018, Hoenig announced that he was stepping down from his role effective April 30, 2018. On May 13, 2019, he joined the Mercatus Center as a Distinguished Senior Fellow.

Speech/criticism
On March 6, 2009, Hoenig presented a widely noted speech entitled 'Too Big Has Failed' critical of the approach taken to the capitalization and liquidity crises and suggesting alternate approaches.

Again on August 13, 2010, in a speech in Lincoln, Nebraska, Hoenig criticized the then current Federal Reserve action of a zero policy rate calling it "...a dangerous gamble."  He also stated, "There may be ways to accelerate GDP growth, but, in my view, highly expansionary monetary policy is not a good option."

References

External links
FDIC biography 
Kansas City Fed biography
Federal Reserve biography
 Too Big Has Failed
 Speeches by President Thomas M. Hoenig
 

1946 births
21st-century American economists
Federal Reserve Bank of Kansas City presidents
Federal Reserve economists
Living people
People from Fort Madison, Iowa
Obama administration personnel
Trump administration personnel